Putao Airport  is an airport in Putao, Myanmar. The airport was originally part of Fort Hertz, which served as an isolated British outpost during the Burma Campaign in World War II.

Airlines and destinations

References

Airports in Myanmar